Harold Gordon Jones (July 22, 1933 – October 20, 2022), was a Canadian ice hockey player with the Trail Smoke Eaters. He represented Canada twice in the Ice Hockey World Championships and won a gold medal at the 1961 World Ice Hockey Championships in Switzerland. He also played in the 1963 World Ice Hockey Championships in Sweden, where he led the 1963 tournament in scoring with 12 points. During his playing career he also played with the Lethbridge Native Sons, Marion Barons, Cleveland Barons, Toledo Mercurys, Rossland Warriors, and New Westminster Royals.

References

1933 births
2022 deaths
Canadian ice hockey centres
Ice hockey people from British Columbia
Sportspeople from Trail, British Columbia